The spruce-fir moss spider (Microhexura montivaga) is an endangered species of spider found at high elevations in the southern Appalachian Mountains. First identified in 1923, it inhabits moss that grows on rocks underneath the forest canopy.

Description
M. montivaga is one of the smallest mygalomorph spiders, with adults only measuring 3 to 4 mm (about 1/8 inch). The coloration varies from light brown to yellow-brown to a darker reddish brown, with no markings on the abdomen. The chelicerae project forward, and one pair of spinnerets is very long. It possesses a second pair of book lungs, which appear as light patches behind the genital furrow.

Biology
M. montivaga constructs tube-shaped webs, apparently for shelter, as prey has never been found in them. It probably feeds on springtails that are abundant in moss mats. Scientists know that spiders play a significant role in controlling insect populations as top predators and that the extinction of one species could ripple impact on other spider species and ecosystems. The spruce-fir moss spider, which consumes its mites in springtails, is the top predator in its microhabitat. M. montivaga can take as long as three years to reach maturity, due to low temperatures and resulting slow metabolism.

Endangered status
The widespread death of Fraser fir trees has destroyed many habitats for M. montivaga, and the spider species was listed as endangered in 1995. Many Fraser firs have died due to infestation with Adelges piceae, the balsam woolly adelgid, an insect pest introduced from Europe. The tallest Peaks found in the southern Appalachians are east of the Mississippi River,  The Fraser Fir and Red Spruce, which are ice age relics, dominate the force that grows on these summits. Compared to other communities in the South East of the United States, it's more like Canada. On the damp,  cold forest floor, bryophytes like mosses and liverworts are widespread, and the threatened Spruce-fir Moss spider lives in bryophyte matting that form on rocks and have just the  right amount of moisture and thickness.  The resulting thinning of the forest canopy leads to the drying of the moss mats that are essential for the spider's survival, as it requires climates of high and constant humidity. These spiders have survived in temperatures that range between -17.8 °C or 0 °F and 19.8 °C or 67.6 °F within mountainous regions of the Southern Appalachians. NatureServe considers the species "Imperiled".

Distribution
M. multivaga is known from Fraser fir and red spruce forests on mountain peaks at and above  in the Southern Appalachian Mountains of North Carolina and Tennessee. It has been recorded from Clingmans Dome and Mount Collins (both very small populations), Mount Le Conte, Mount Mitchell (probably extirpated), Grandfather Mountain, and Roan Mountain.

The Tennessee population, located in Sevier County, was considered healthy up to 1989, but is now possibly extirpated. On two locations in North Carolina, there was only one spider found each in recent years. Only the population along the Avery/Caldwell County line in North Carolina seems to be relatively stable. This population appears to be restricted to the moss mats on a single rock outcrop and a few surrounding boulders.

References

External links

Further reading
Crosby CR, Bishop SC (1925). "Two New Spiders from the Blue Ridge Mountains of North Carolina (Araneina)". Entomological News 36: 142-146. ("Microhexura montivagus [sic]", new species, pp. 145–146).

Spiders of the United States
Mygalomorphae
Natural history of the Great Smoky Mountains
Spider, Spruce-fir moss
ESA endangered species
Species endangered by habitat loss